Sepia mira is a species of cuttlefish native to the southwestern Pacific Ocean, specifically from the mouth of Clarence River, New South Wales to off Wooli in Australia. It lives at depths of between 20 and 72 m.

S. mira grows to a mantle length of 55 mm.

The type specimen was collected in Capricorn Group, North-West Islet, Queensland. It is deposited at the South Australian Museum in Adelaide.

References

External links

Cuttlefish
Molluscs described in 1932
Molluscs of the Pacific Ocean